The Business and Technology Education Council (BTEC) is a provider of secondary school leaving qualifications and further education qualifications in England, Wales and Northern Ireland. Whilst the T in BTEC previously stood for Technical, according to the DFE (2016) it now stands for Technology. BTECs originated in 1984 and were awarded by Edexcel from 1996. Their origins lie in the Business Education Council, formed in 1974 to "rationalise and improve the relevance of sub-degree vocational education". It is a wholly owned subsidiary of Pearson plc.

BTEC qualifications, especially Level 3, are accepted by all UK universities (in many instances combined with other qualifications such as A Levels)  when assessing the suitability of applicants for admission, and many such universities base their conditional admissions offers on a student's predicted BTEC grades. Currently, Imperial College is the only university in Britain not to accept BTECs at all.

A report by the Social Market Foundation in January 2018 found that more than a quarter (26%) of university applicants in England entered HE with at least one BTEC qualification. The research found that BTECs provide a particularly significant route to higher education for specific groups, with almost half students entering university with a BTEC, alongside large numbers of students in specific regions, including the North West, Yorkshire and the Humber, North East and West Midlands. This followed a separate report published by HEPI in 2017 on BTECs and higher education.

Qualification subjects
BTEC qualifications are equivalent to other qualifications, such as the General Certificate of Secondary Education (GCSE) (levels 1 to 2), A Level (level 3) and university degrees (levels 6 to 7). BTECs are undertaken in vocational subjects ranging from business studies to engineering.

Examples of qualifications include:

 Animal Management
 Applied Law
 Applied Science
 Applied Psychology
 Art & Design
 Business
 Computing
 Children's Care and Learning
 Creative Digital Media Production
 Early Years & Education
 Engineering
 Finance
 Hair & Beauty
 Hospitality
 Health & Social Care
 Music / Music Technology
 Performing Arts
 Public Services
 Sports Science
 Travel & Tourism

History 
The BTEC (Business and Technology Education Council) was formed by the merger of the Business Education Council (BEC) and the Technical Education Council (TEC).  The University of London Examinations & Assessment Council (ULEAC) and BTEC merged to form Edexcel.

Awards and course system

School leaving qualification (Level 3)  

The following Level 3 courses, known as BTEC National Diplomas, are intended for those with five or more GCSE grades A*-C including English, mathematics and science. The qualification names for Level 3 courses changed dependent on whether they were awarded through the forthcoming National Qualification Framework (NQF) or the predecessor Qualification Credit Framework (QCF):

School leaving qualification (Level 2)
The following Level 2 courses, known as BTEC Firsts, are intended for students at GCSE level as a vocational equivalent. There are no BTEC courses for English, or mathematics. Students who do not achieve the minimum Level 2 Pass grade will receive a Level 1 Pass in the given qualification equivalent to GCSE grades D-E and therefore does not count to the A*-C measurement system. The qualification names for Level 2 courses changed dependent on whether they were awarded though the current National Qualification Framework (NQF) or the predecessor Qualification Credit Framework (QCF):

See also
 Cambridge Technicals, similar to the BTEC qualifications
 Council for National Academic Awards
 National Vocational Qualification
 Scottish Qualifications Authority, an equivalent Scottish body

References

Business education in the United Kingdom
Education in the London Borough of Camden
Educational qualifications in the United Kingdom
Engineering education in the United Kingdom
Organisations based in the London Borough of Camden
Pearson plc